Sam Cooper is a Canadian investigative journalist and best-selling author, best known for his coverage of Canada–China relations and tensions.

Career 
Cooper has been an investigative journalist for a number of years, first establishing himself for his anti-corruption reporting at Vancouver-based newspaper The Province.

He left the Postmedia newspapers to work for Global News, where his coverage on money laundering In Canada, alleging a relationship between foreign states colluding with organized crime.

Cooper turned his reporting into the controversial best-seller Willful Blindness, which alleges Canadian officials intentionally ignored money laundering linked to organized crime based out of China. His work builds on allegations made in the Canadian-intelligence report Project Sidewinder, which argues spies have infiltrated the country's institutions.

Controversy 
Cooper alleges Canadian senator Yuen Pau Woo lobbied on behalf of Beijing, as well as organized an attack on the credibility of Andy Yan, an academic at Simon Fraser University. Woo has publicly accused the Cooper of failing to fact check the allegations, nor seeking his response before making said allegations.

In May 2020, the official WeChat group for Canadian Liberal Party of Canada politician Joyce Murray began fundraising to sue Cooper after he made allegations a Chinese-government group had begun to stockpile Canadian personal protective equipment at the start of the COVID-19 pandemic. Murray condemned the group's actions, and distanced herself for an organized attack against a journalist.

References 

Year of birth missing (living people)
Living people
Canadian investigative journalists
Canadian male journalists
21st-century Canadian journalists
Global Television Network people